Tempo Storm is an American esports professional video game team that has teams competing in Age of Empires II, FIFA, Magic: The Gathering, fighting games, and Shadowverse. They have formerly held divisions in Hearthstone, Heroes of the Storm, Fortnite, League of Legends, Counter-Strike: Global Offensive, Overwatch, Vainglory, Tom Clancy's Rainbow Six Siege, World of Warcraft, and PlayerUnknown's Battlegrounds.

Owner 
Andrey "Reynad" Yanyuk (born January 27, 1992) is the owner and founder of Tempo Storm. Yanyuk has placed top 4 in Dreamhack and won multiple online tournaments such as Battle of the Best.

Current divisions

FIFA

Fighting games 
Tempo Storm expanded into the FGC on March 9, 2015, beginning with the sponsorship of Christopher "NYChrisG" Gonzalez. On July 2, 2015, Weston "Westballz" Dennis and Jeffrey "Axe" Williamson joined Tempo Storm. On March 1, 2016, NYChrisG was released from Tempo Storm as his contract expired. Westballz left Tempo Storm to join G2 Esports on July 11, 2016. On July 14, 2016, Tempo Storm announced the signing of Johnny "S2J" Kim. On November 7, 2018, Tempo Storm announced the signing of Gonzalo Barrios., and would go on to drop ZeRo on Jul 20, 2020, following sexual assault claims made towards him, which he would later admit to.

Magic: The Gathering

Shadowverse

Former divisions

Age of Empires 
Tempo Storm formerly sponsored two players, Hamzah El-Baher and Kai Kallinger, who were better known as Hera and Liereyy respectively.

Hera's biggest achievements in 2020 include winning Battle of Africa 2, and placing 2nd in Hidden Cup 3, Nili's Apartment Cup 3,Redbull Wololo 2 and winning Hidden Cup IV
. Hera continues to compete at the highest level of Age of Empires II while also being one of the game's most popular content creators on Twitch and YouTube. On August 18, 2021, Hera announced on Twitter that he would be leaving Tempo Storm and rejoining his old team, Aftermath.

Liereyy signed with Tempo Storm on October 3, 2020. He announced he was leaving Tempo Storm on July 29, 2021, in a YouTube video posted on his channel.

Counter-Strike: Global Offensive 
On February 12, 2016, Tempo Storm picked up the Brazilian CS:GO roster of Games Academy. Four days later the newly signed team upset several top North American teams to qualify for Intel Extreme Masters Season X - Katowice. Tempo Storm won the CEVO Gfinity Season 9 Finals on May 3, 2016, where they beat Virtus.pro in the semi-finals and SK Gaming in the finals. On May 8, 2016, the team placed second at DreamHack Austin 2016, losing to fellow Brazilian team Luminosity Gaming in the finals. Tempo Storm went on to sell the roster to Immortals on June 1, 2016.

On August 11, 2017, Tempo Storm picked up two rosters. The first roster consists of former players of paiN Gaming and Luminosity Gaming The second team, named Tempo Storm SE, was formed from mainly former players of Rogue Academy.

Fortnite 
Tempo Storm joined Fortnite esports with a four player roster February 25, 2018.

Hearthstone 
Tempo Storm's Hearthstone roster consisted of Andrey "Reynad" Yanyuk, Dan "Frodan" Chou, Petar "Gaara" Stevanovic, Johnnie "Ratsmah" Lee, David "Justsaiyan" Shan, and Haiyun "Eloise" Tang.

Hyerim "MagicAmy" Lee left Tempo Storm February 17, 2015 following accusations of being a fake identity and account boosting and win trading.

On May 5, 2015, Tempo Storm added Johnnie "Ratsmah" Lee, a Hearthstone arena specialist to the roster.

On June 9, 2015, David "Justsaiyan" Shan and Haiyun "Eloise" Tang joined Tempo Storm.

On October 14, 2016, Victor "VLPS" Lopez joined the team.

Trump was signed by Tempo Storm in 2017 after leaving Team Solo Mid due to disagreements. Trump left Tempo Storm in 2018 on good terms.

Heroes of the Storm 
On June 2, 2015, Tempo Storm's Heroes of the Storm team swept Cloud9 Maelstrom in WCA NA final. Tempo Storm received 7-8th at the 2015 Heroes of the Storm World Championship in November. On November 9, 2015, Tempo Storm dropped Zuna and Arthelon.

On June 28, 2016, Tempo Storm ceased sponsorship of their North American Heroes of the Storm team. On July 20, 2016, Tempo Storm signed world champions Tempest, a South Korean Heroes of the Storm team. That roster disbanded on November 2, 2016, after reaching 4th place in OGN Super League Season 3 and thus failing to qualify for the Fall Global Championship at BlizzCon.

Prior to the start of the 2017 Heroes Global Circuit, Tempo Storm re-entered the North American professional scene by signing the former Astral Authority roster on January 5, 2017. This iteration of the Tempo Storm Roster went on to win 1st in the Heroes of the Storm Global Championship Pro League Phase 1 for North America.

League of Legends 
In Spring Split of 2017, Tempo Storm picked up a professional League of Legends team to compete in the North American Challenger Series (NACS).

In the Summer Split of the North American Challenger Series, they introduced a new roster. while keeping Diego "Quas" Ruiz and Jamie "Sheep" Gallagher. In late 2017, Tempo Storm's academy dissolved.

Overwatch 
Tempo Storm expanded its presence in Esports on August 17, 2016, by signing the Australian team formerly known as Untitled Spreadsheet (captained by James "Yuki" Stanton and manager Philip Pretty). Two weeks later, on August 31, Tempo Storm formed a new North American team (captained by David "NapTime" Fox and manager Shane "Dvexx" Waters) that would compete in the pro league. The North American roster was updated on May 2, 2017, and the Australian Overwatch Team was let go at the same time. Tempo Storm does not currently have any active Overwatch team.

The former North American team competed in the Overwatch Contenders Cup, a tournament that took place the weekend of June 3, 2017, with over 600 teams competing. Tempo Storm made it to group stages with 16 other teams including Team Liquid and Cloud9.

Tom Clancy's Rainbow Six Siege 
On July 25, 2019, Tempo Storm signed retired Rainbow Six Siege pro and streamer, Steven "Snake_Nade" White as a streamer.
On November 29, 2019, Tempo Storm signed the Pro League team, 2Faced. The original Tempo Storm Rainbow Six Siege lineup consisted of Alex "Butterz" O'Campo, Tim "Creators" Humpherys, Mitchell "Dream" Malson, Xavier "Filthy" Garcia, Giuliano "Krazy" Solon, Trevor "KenZ" Kenzie as Coach, and Tanner "Forceful" McHattie and David "DnA" Thomas as analysts.

Vainglory 
On April 15, 2017, Tempo Storm signed the team 101 as its new Vainglory team. The team consisted of Alonso "Selena" Lara, Rhodney "Hide" Nerves, Christopher "LostBoyToph" Basco and Christopher "Poli5208" Keokot. Tempo Storm announced they were parting ways with the roster on November 21st, 2017.

References

External links
 

Esports teams based in the United States
Defunct and inactive Hearthstone teams
Heroes of the Storm teams
Fighting game player sponsors
Super Smash Bros. player sponsors
Defunct and inactive Counter-Strike teams
World of Warcraft teams
Tempo Storm players
Former League of Legends Challenger Series teams
Esports teams established in 2014
Tom Clancy's Rainbow Six Siege teams
Defunct and inactive Overwatch teams